Correa Moylan Walsh was an author born in Newburgh, New York, on September 23, 1862. He died on March 10, 1936.  He was an early expert in the field of index numbers. A polymath, he wrote on a wide range of topics: from mathematics, economics, and statistics, on the one hand (that of mathematics and the mathematical sciences) to philosophy, political science, literature, and philosophy of history, on the other (that of the humanities and social sciences).

Books
 The Measurement of General Exchange-Value. (New York: The Macmillan Company; London: Macmillan & Co., 1901)
 The Fundamental Problem in Monetary Science. (New York: The Macmillan Company; London: Macmillan & Co., 1903)
 Shakespeare's Complete Sonnets: A New Arrangement With Introduction and Notes. (London and Leipsic: T. Fisher Unwin, 1908)
 The Doctrine of Creation. (London: T. Fisher Unwin, 1910)
 The Political Science of John Adams: A Study in the Theory of Mixed Government and the Bicameral System. (New York and London: G. P. Putnam's Sons, 1915)
 The Climax of Civilisation. (New York: Sturgis & Walton Company, 1917)
 Socialism. (New York: Sturgis & Walton Company, 1917)
 Feminism. (New York: Sturgis & Walton Company, 1917)
 The Problem of Estimation; A Seventeenth-Century Controversy and its Bearing on Modern Statistical Questions, Especially Index-Numbers. (London: P.S. King & Son, 1921)
 The Four Kinds of Economic Value. (Cambridge: Harvard University Press, 1926)
 An Attempted Proof of Fermat's Last Theorem By A New Method. (New York: G. E. Stechert & co., 1932)

Articles 

 Shaw's History of Currency. (Quarterly Journal of Economics, July, 1896)
 The Steadily Appreciating Standard. (Quarterly Journal of Economics, April, 1897)
 Kant's Transcendental Idealism and Empirical Realism. (Mind, October, 1903, and January, 1904)
 Franklin and Plato. (The Open Court, March, 1906)
 The Best Form of Index Number: Discussion. (Quarterly Publications of the American Statistical Association, March, 1921)
 Professor Edgeworth’s View on Index-Numbers. (Quarterly Journal of Economics, May, 1924)

References

Links

 

1862 births
1936 deaths
19th-century American economists
19th-century American non-fiction writers
20th-century American economists
21st-century American non-fiction writers
Alumni of Balliol College, Oxford
American male non-fiction writers
Economists from New York (state)
Harvard University alumni
Mathematics writers
People from Newburgh, New York
Writers from New York (state)